Valle San Nicolao is a comune (municipality) in the Province of Biella in the Italian region Piedmont, located about  northeast of Turin and about  northeast of Biella.

Valle San Nicolao borders the following municipalities: Bioglio, Camandona, Cossato, Pettinengo, Piatto, Piedicavallo, Quaregna, Scopello, Strona, Trivero, Vallanzengo, Valle Mosso.

Demographic evolution

References

Cities and towns in Piedmont